McIntosh Branch is a stream in northwest Montgomery County in the U.S. state of Missouri. It is a tributary of the Loutre River.

McIntosh Branch has the name of a pioneer citizen.

See also
List of rivers of Missouri

References

Rivers of Montgomery County, Missouri
Rivers of Missouri